Hans Ainson (also Hans Hainson; 27 September 1862 Tarvastu Parish (now Viljandi Parish), Kreis Fellin – 6 June 1950 Tarvastu Parish, Viljandi County) was an Estonian politician. He was a member of III Riigikogu, representing the Farmers' Assemblies. On 12 January 1927, he resigned his position and he was replaced by Mart Martinson.

References

1862 births
1950 deaths
People from Viljandi Parish
People from Kreis Fellin
Farmers' Assemblies politicians
Members of the Riigikogu, 1926–1929